Chennamsetty Ramachandraiah (born 1947) is a politician of the YSR Congress party and Chartered Accountant by profession. He was a Member of the Legislative Council and a minister of endowments in the state cabinet of Andhra Pradesh. He was the Opposition leader of the Andhra Pradesh Legislative council. He is from Rajampeta, Kadapa district, Andhra Pradesh.

A chartered accountant by profession, Ramchandraiah was a bank employee before entering politics in 1981.

Political career 
He was elected to the Andhra Pradesh Legislative Assembly in 1985 and served as a minister in the state cabinet in 1986–88. He was also a member of the Rajya Sabha for two terms. He held many positions in the Telugu Desam Party (TDP), including as a member of its politburo. He quit TDP citing difference with Chandrababu Naidu in 2008.

After the PRP merged with the Indian National Congress, Ramachandraiah was elected as MLC in Congress Party. On 19 January 2012 he also got Endowments ministry. This is his second time of being in state ministry cabinets.

He joined YSRCP in 2018. He got elected as MLC in 2021.

References

Indian National Congress politicians from Andhra Pradesh
1947 births
Living people
Telugu politicians
Telugu Desam Party politicians
Andhra Pradesh MLAs 1985–1989
Rajya Sabha members from Andhra Pradesh
Leaders of the Opposition in the Andhra Pradesh Legislative Council
Praja Rajyam Party politicians